HMAS Shepparton (A 03) is a Paluma-class survey motor launch of the Royal Australian Navy (RAN).

Design and construction

The Paluma-class vessels have a full load displacement of 320 tonnes. Propulsion machinery consists of two General Motors Detroit Diesel 12V-92T engines, which supply  to the two propeller shafts.

The sensor suite of a Paluma-class launch consists of a JRC JMA-3710-6 navigational radar, an ELAC LAZ 72 side-scan mapping sonar, and a Skipper 113 hull-mounted scanning sonar. The vessels are unarmed. The standard ship's company consists of three officers and eleven sailors, although another four personnel can be accommodated. The catamarans were originally painted white, but were repainted naval grey in 2002.

Shepparton was laid down at Eglo Engineering's shipyard in Port Adelaide, South Australia on 21 September 1988, launched on 5 December 1989, and commissioned into the RAN on 24 January 1990. The ship was named for the city of Shepparton, Victoria.

Operational history
In January 2011, Shepparton was one of three RAN vessels deployed to survey Moreton Bay and the Brisbane River for submerged debris as part of Operation Queensland Flood Assist, the Australian Defence Force response to the 2010–11 Queensland floods.

In October 2013, Shepparton participated in the International Fleet Review 2013 in Sydney.

Citations

References

External links

Paluma-class survey motor launches
Survey ships of the Royal Australian Navy
Naval ships of Australia
1989 ships